Manget is a surname. Notable people with the surname include:

 Fred Manget (1880–1979), American medical missionary in China
 Jean-Jacques Manget (1652–1742), Genevan physician and writer